2008–09 season of Argentine football was the 118th season of competitive football in Argentina.

National leagues

Men's

Primera División

Apertura champion: Boca Juniors (23rd title).
Top scorer:  José Sand (15 goals).
Clausura champion: Vélez Sarsfield (7th title).
Top scorer: José Sand (13 goals).
International qualifiers:
2009 Copa Libertadores: Boca Juniors, San Lorenzo, Estudiantes (LP).
2010 Copa Libertadores: Vélez Sarsfield.
2009 Copa Sudamericana: Lanús, Vélez Sarsfield, San Lorenzo, Tigre.
2009 FIFA Club World Cup:  Estudiantes (LP).
2010 Recopa Sudamericana:  Estudiantes (LP).
Relegated: Gimnasia y Esgrima (J), San Martín (T)
Source: RSSSF

Primera B Nacional
Champion: Atlético Tucumán (1st title).
Top scorer: Luis Rodríguez (20 goals).
Promoted: Atlético Tucumán, Chacarita Juniors.
Relegated: Talleres de Córdoba, Almagro, Los Andes.
Source: RSSSF

Primera B Metropolitana
Champion: Sportivo Italiano (2nd title).
Top scorer: Luciano Lo Bianco  (20 goals).
Promoted:  Sportivo Italiano, Deportivo Merlo.
Relegated: Talleres (RE).
Source: RSSSF

Torneo Argentino A
Champion: Boca Unidos (1st title).
Top scorer: Cristian Núñez  (19 goals).
Promoted: Boca Unidos.
Relegated: Talleres de Perico, Real Arroyo Seco, Gimnasia (Mendoza), Alvarado.
Source: RSSSF

Primera C Metropolitana
Champion: Villa San Carlos (1st title).
Top scorer: Gustavo Pastor (21 goles).
Promoted: Villa San Carlos.
Relegated: Cañuelas
Source: RSSSF

Torneo Argentino B
Promoted: Unión de Mar del Plata, Estudiantes de Río Cuarto, Sportivo Belgrano, Crucero del Norte.
Relegated: Deportivo Coreano, Sportivo 9 de Julio, Sol de América, Racing de Trelew.
Source: RSSSF

Primera D Metropolitana
Champion: Ferrocarril Midland (3rd title).
Top scorer: Damián Solferino (24 goles).
Promoted: Ferrocarril Midland.
Relegated: Puerto Nuevo.
Source: RSSSF

Torneo Argentino C
Promoted: Ferrocarril Sud de Olavarria, Union de Villa Krause, Independiente de Tandil, Boca de Rio Gallegos.
Source: RSSSF

Women's

Campeonato de Fútbol Femenino
Apertura champion: San Lorenzo (1st title).
Clausura champion: River Plate (9th title).
International qualifier: 
2009 Copa Libertadores de Fútbol Femenino: San Lorenzo.
Source: RSSSF

Clubs in international competitions

National teams

Men's
This section covers Argentina men's matches from August 1, 2008 to July 31, 2009.

For the Olympic Games results, please see here. Those results are not tallied here because the team is made of Under–23 players, not the full squad.

Friendly matches

2010 World Cup qualifiers

Women's
This section covers Argentina women's matches from August 1, 2008 to July 31, 2009.

2008 Women's Olympic football tournament

References

External links
AFA
Argentina on FIFA.com

 
Seasons in Argentine football